Zieria insularis is a plant in the citrus family Rutaceae and endemic to tropical north-eastern Queensland. It is an open, straggly shrub with wiry or spindly branches, three-part leaves and between one and a few white flowers with four petals and four stamens arranged in the leaf axils. It mostly grows near granite outcrops which are surrounded by forest or rainforest.

Description
The leaves are composed of three elliptic to narrow egg-shaped or lance-shaped leaflets. The upper side of the leaflets is mostly glabrous and the lower side is slightly hairy.

Taxonomy and naming
Zieria insularis was first formally described in 2007 by Marco Duretto and Paul Forster from a specimen collected in the Mount Windsor National Park adjacent to the Daintree National Park and the description was published in Austrobaileya. The specific epithet (insularis) is a Latin word meaning "of islands" referring to the species often occurring near "islands" of granite.

Distribution and habitat
This zieria grows near granite outcrops which are surrounded by rainforest, near granite outcrops in forest and on granite ridges in open forest. It is only known from the Mount Windsor tableland and the nearby Daintree National Park.

References

insularis
Sapindales of Australia
Flora of Queensland
Plants described in 2007
Taxa named by Paul Irwin Forster
Taxa named by Marco Duretto